Charlie is a line of women's and men's fragrances produced by the American cosmetic and perfume house Revlon. 

On June 16, 2022, its parent, Revlon, filed for Chapter 11 bankruptcy.

Advertising
Charlie, named after Charles Revson, was released in 1973. It was originally launched to compete with Estée, a fragrance released by Estée Lauder. Ad campaigns for the scent featured models Shelley Hack, Charly Stember, and, notably, Naomi Sims, making Sims the first African American woman in history to be featured in a cosmetic company's advertising. Television ads featured Shelley Hack and jingles sung by Bobby Short and Mel Tormé. Young, working women were set as the target audience, and the ads were said to represent the "new woman" of the era.  Hack and Stember wore pantsuits by Ralph Lauren and were the first women to wear pants in fragrance ads. The response proved to be profitable for Revlon, as Charlie became the world's top selling perfume within three years. However, a later ad, showing a female model patting a male model on the backside, was controversial. While some praised the ad as being "playful" and representing "female self-sufficiency," others called it "sexist" and "in poor taste." Subsequent advertising in later decades featured Lauren Hutton, Sharon Stone and Cindy Crawford, with jingles sung by Little Richard. Oprah Winfrey dedicated a segment of her talk show in 2007 to discuss the impact of Charlie advertising featuring Hack as her guest. Winfrey stated that the ads inspired her. She wanted to be "confident and fabulous" like the "Charlie girl". Hack agreed,"It was a time when women were changing. Women looked at [the ad] and said 'I want to be like that.'"

Fragrance composition
Charlie is classified as a floral-aldehyde fragrance. It is composed of citrus, bergamot, hyacinth, green leaf, tarragon, peach, and aldehyde top notes, cyclamen, carnation, orris root, lily of the valley, jasmine and rose middle notes, and sandalwood, musk, vanilla, oakmoss, and cedar base notes.

Additional fragrances for women
Spin-off women's fragrances with the Charlie name included:

 Charlie Blue (1973)
 Charlie Oriental (1989) 
 Charlie Red (1993)
 Charlie White (1994)
 Charlie Gold (1995)
 Charlie Express (1995)
 Charlie Sunshine (1997)
 Charlie White Musk (1997)
 Charlie Silver (1998)
 Charlie Instinct (2000)
 Charlie Crystal Chic (2008)
 Charlie Pink Sparkle (2008)
 Charlie Little Secrets (2008)
 Charlie Secret (2009)
 Charlie Real (2009)
 Charlie Pink (2009)
 Charlie Black (2009)
 Charlie Passion (2009)
 Charlie Enchant (2012)
 Charlie Shimmer (2013) 
 Charlie Divine (2015)
 Charlie Rio Rebel (2016)
 Charlie Sexy (2018)

Some lines also included complementary bath and body products. Currently, Charlie Red is only in production in Australia and Italy and Spain. Charlie Blue, White, Gold, Silver, Secret, Real, Pink, Black, and Passion are only available in Italy, while Charlie Crystal Chic, Pink Sparkle, and Little Secrets are only sold in South Africa. Production of Charlie Red and Charlie White was discontinued in North America in 2011, leaving the original Charlie as the only fragrance still available in this market.
All Charlie fragrances are available in the United Kingdom.

Additional fragrances for men

 Charlie Men (1974) (no longer in production)
 Chaz (no longer in production)

Notes

References
Groom, Nigel. The New Perfume Handbook. New York: Blackie Academic & Professional, 1997.
Sengupta, Subroto. Brand Positioning: Strategies for Competitive Advantage. New Delhi: McGraw-Hill, 2005.

Perfumes
Revlon brands
Companies that filed for Chapter 11 bankruptcy in 2022